Yaroslav Yuryevich Dronov (born November 22, 1991), better known by his stage name Shaman, is a Russian singer-songwriter and music producer. He is well known for writing and producing pop and rock music. His style mixes contemporary music, ethnic singing and unique vocal techniques. He performed on Faktor A (the Russian version of The X Factor) in 2013 and the Russian version of The Voice in 2014. His 2022 single "Let's Get Up" (Russian: Встанем; romanized: Vstanem), amassed 32 million views on YouTube and was featured on the Russian state news channel Russia-1. Shaman was voted the second best Russian singer of 2022 in a poll by the state-owned Russian Public Opinion Research Center.

He is best known for his patriotic song . The song became a pop-culture phenomenon in Russia and was parodied in popular media.

Shaman supported the Russian invasion of Ukraine, and was invited to speak and perform at government-organized ceremonies.

See also 
Baja Mali Knindža, a similar Serbian singer

References 

1991 births
Living people
Russian nationalists
Nationalist musicians
Russian male singer-songwriters
Russian record producers
People from Novomoskovsk
Anti-Ukrainian sentiment in Russia